Ujung Lero is a town on the south-west coast of Sulawesi, Indonesia. A fishing port, the locals are skilled craftsmen in making boats and fishing. English explorer Charley Boorman visited Ujung Lero as part the televisions series Right to the Edge: Sydney to Tokyo By Any Means in 2009.

Populated places in South Sulawesi